More Delights is a studio album by pianists Tommy Flanagan and Hank Jones, recorded in 1978 for the Galaxy label and released in 1985. The album features alternate takes of the piano duets released on Our Delights.

Reception

Allmusic awarded the album 4 stars, stating: "These "new" performances (plus duo versions of "'Round Midnight" and "If You Could See Me Now") are as tasteful and as enjoyable as the "older" ones".

Track listing
 "Robbins Nest" [Alternate Take] (Illinois Jacquet, Charles Thompson) - 7:28 
 "'Round Midnight" (Thelonious Monk, Cootie Williams, Bernie Hanighen) - 5:46
 "Lady Bird" [Alternate Take] (Tadd Dameron) -	3:55
 "Jordu" [Alternate Take] (Duke Jordan) - 3:57
 "Our Delight" [Alternate Take] (Dameron) - 4:03
 "A Child Is Born" [Alternate Take] (Thad Jones) - 5:47
 "Autumn Leaves" [Alternate Take] (Joseph Kosma, Jacques Prévert, Johnny Mercer) - 5:44
 "If You Could See Me Now" (Dameron) -	5:36

Personnel 
Tommy Flanagan, Hank Jones  - piano

References 

1985 albums
Tommy Flanagan albums
Hank Jones albums
Galaxy Records albums